Marshall McEwan (26 June 1883 – 6 January 1966) was a Scottish footballer who played in the Football League for Blackpool, Bolton Wanderers and Chelsea.

During his five-year spell with Bolton he came into consideration for the Scotland national team, playing in the Home Scots v Anglo-Scots trial match in 1906 and 1907, but this did not lead on to a full cap.

References

1883 births
1966 deaths
Scottish footballers
Association football forwards
English Football League players
Blackpool F.C. players
Bolton Wanderers F.C. players
Chelsea F.C. players
Rutherglen Glencairn  F.C. players
Scottish Junior Football Association players
NIFL Premiership players
Linfield F.C. players
Fleetwood Town F.C. players
Sportspeople from Rutherglen
Footballers from South Lanarkshire